Buruku is a Local Government Area of Benue State, Nigeria. Its headquarters are in the town of Buruku.
 
It has an area of 1,246 km2 and a population of 203,721 at the 2006 census.
Buruku LGA has the following districts (wards) with their projected population as at December, 2017:

Over 80% of adults in this rural population is engaged in food crop production but each household also holds some livestock and citrus farm. The crop farmers produce yams, cassava, soyabeans, rice, groundnuts, sesame seed (beniseed), beans, guinea corn, millet, bambara nuts, ginger, sugar cane and maize. Buruku is a riverine local government area with large areas of Katsina-Ala River Basin where sugar cane is planted in commercial quantity. Rice is also produced in commercial quantities along the River Katsina-Ala basin and its streams/tributaries. Popular local markets in Buruku LGA are Ityowanye, Adi, Abwa, Buruku, Adogo, Kur, Usen, Agwabi, Ortese-Mbashian, Gbanyam, Ugah, Jingir, and Dogo/Wuna.  Buruku has a large citrus and soya beans market at Ityowanye.

The postal code of the area is 981.

References

 3. "National Population Commission, 2006 Census Figures."

 4. "World Health Organization (WHO), Nigeria Population by Zone, State, LGA and Ward."

Local Government Areas in Benue State